The Sawbill Creek is a  stream in northeastern Minnesota, the United States.  It rises at the outlet of Sawbill Lake and is a tributary of the Temperance River.

See also
List of rivers of Minnesota

References

External links
Minnesota Watersheds
USGS Hydrologic Unit Map - State of Minnesota (1974)

Rivers of Minnesota
Rivers of Cook County, Minnesota